Eric Christian Yardley (born August 18, 1990) is an American professional baseball pitcher in the Arizona Diamondbacks organization. He has played in Major League Baseball (MLB) for the San Diego Padres and Milwaukee Brewers.

Career
Yardley attended Richland High School in Richland, Washington. He attended Seattle University and played college baseball for the Redhawks for four seasons (2010-2013).

Yardley was undrafted out of college in 2013, and played for the Taos Blizzard and the Trinidad Triggers of the independent Pecos League.

San Diego Padres
He signed a minor league contract with the San Diego Padres on July 21, 2013. He played for the AZL Padres in 2013, going 2–0 with a 1.89 ERA in 19 innings. He split the 2014 season between the Fort Wayne TinCaps and the San Antonio Missions, combining to go 2–4 with a 2.95 ERA in 65 innings. He split the 2015 season between the Lake Elsinore Storm and San Antonio, combining to go 2–5 with a 2.97 ERA in  innings. Following the 2015 season, Yardley played for the Peoria Javelinas of the Arizona Fall League. 

Yardley split the 2016, 2017, and 2018 seasons each between San Antonio and the El Paso Chihuahuas. He combined to go 3–2 with a 2.93 ERA over  innings in 2016, 3–2 with a 2.05 ERA over 70 innings in 2017, and 5–4 with a 4.13 ERA over  innings in 2018. He opened the 2019 season back with El Paso, going 0–2 with a 2.83 ERA and 52 strikeouts over  innings.  

On August 21, 2019, the Padres selected Yardley's contract and promoted him to the major leagues. In 10 games for the Padres, Yardley went 0–1 with a 2.31 ERA and 7 strikeouts in  innings. Yardley was designated for assignment on November 4, 2019.

Milwaukee Brewers
On November 15, 2019, Yardley was claimed off waivers by the Milwaukee Brewers. Yardley enjoyed a great year for the Brewers in 2020, pitching to a 2-0 record and a 1.54 ERA with 19 strikeouts in 23.1 innings of work. Yardley was not quite as successful in 2021, struggling to a 6.75 ERA in 17 appearances with the Brewers. On November 5, 2021, Yardley was outrighted off of the 40-man roster and elected free agency.

Chicago Cubs
On January 25, 2022, Yardley signed a minor league contract with the Chicago Cubs. Yardley struggled immensely to the tune of a 17.36 ERA in 5 appearances for the Triple-A Iowa Cubs before he was released on May 2.

Toronto Blue Jays
On May 25, 2022, Yardley signed a minor league contract with the Toronto Blue Jays organization and was assigned to the Triple-A Buffalo Bisons. In 32 appearances with Buffalo, Yardley registered a 3-2 record and 4.13 ERA with 31 strikeouts in 32.2 innings pitched. He elected free agency on November 10, 2022.

Arizona Diamondbacks
On January 25, 2023, Yardley signed a minor league contract with the Arizona Diamondbacks organization.

Personal life
Yardley is married to Tia Yardley.

References

External links

Seattle Redhawks bio

1990 births
Living people
Arizona League Padres players
Baseball players from Washington (state)
Buffalo Bisons (minor league) players
El Paso Chihuahuas players
Fort Wayne TinCaps players
Gigantes del Cibao players
American expatriate baseball players in the Dominican Republic
Lake Elsinore Storm players
Major League Baseball pitchers
Milwaukee Brewers players
Nashville Sounds players
People from Richland, Washington
Peoria Javelinas players
San Antonio Missions players
San Diego Padres players
Seattle Redhawks baseball players
Taos Blizzard players
Trinidad Triggers players